Verdens Ende ("World's End", or "The End of the Earth" in Norwegian) is located at the southernmost tip of the island of Tjøme in Færder municipality, Norway.

It is composed of various islets and rocks and is one of the most popular scenic spots in the area, with panoramic views of the Skagerrak and fishing facilities. It also has a replica of an old Vippefyr, an early type of beacon or lighthouse, erected in 1934.

At Verdens Ende is the visitors' centre of Færder National Park, a large section of outer Oslofjorden; the national park covers 340 square kilometres of mainland, islands, skerries and sea bed in the municipality of Færder.

An ultramarathon endurance foot race, Soria Moria til Verdens Ende has its finish line at this point, and starts at the Hotel Soria Moria in Oslo, 100 miles (161 km) away.

References

External links

 Webcamera at Verdens ende
 Ultramarathon foot race website

Populated places in Vestfold og Telemark
Villages in Vestfold og Telemark
Tjøme